is a paralympic athlete from Japan competing mainly in category T52 sprint events.

Miki competed in both the 2000 and 2004 Summer Paralympics. In the 2000 event she competed in the 800m and won bronze medals in both the 200m and 400m, in both events losing to gold medalist Lisa Franks. In the 2004 games she again competed in the 200m and 400m but was unable to medal in either.

References

Paralympic athletes of Japan
Athletes (track and field) at the 2000 Summer Paralympics
Athletes (track and field) at the 2004 Summer Paralympics
Paralympic bronze medalists for Japan
Living people
Medalists at the 2000 Summer Paralympics
Year of birth missing (living people)
Paralympic medalists in athletics (track and field)
Japanese female wheelchair racers
21st-century Japanese women